Cheyyur is a state assembly constituency in Tamil Nadu, India, that was formed after constituency delimitation in 2007. Its State Assembly Constituency number is 34. Located in Chengalpattu district, it comprises Cheyyur taluk and a portion of Tirukalukundram taluk. It is included in the Kancheepuram parliamentary constituency for elections to the Parliament of India. It is reserved for candidates from the Scheduled Castes. It is one of the 234 State Legislative Assembly Constituencies in Tamil Nadu in India.

Members of Legislative Assembly

Election results

2021

2016

2011

References

Assembly constituencies of Tamil Nadu
Kanchipuram district